Marshall T. Rose (born 1961) is a network protocol and software engineer, author, and speaker who has contributed to the Internet Engineering Task Force (IETF), the Internet, and Internet and network applications. More specifically, he has specialized in network management, distributed systems management, applications management, email, the ISO Development Environment (ISODE), and service-oriented architecture (SOA).

Rose holds a Ph.D. in Information and Computer Science from the University of California, Irvine and is former area director for network management of the IETF.

Rose is presently Principal Engineer at Brave (web browser).

IETF
Rose's work on behalf of the Internet Engineering Task Force has included:
 Area Director for network management, 1993-1995.
 Chair, MARID, MTA Authorization Records in DNS. IETF working group, Applications area. Concluded September 2004.
 Chair, OPES, Open Pluggable Edge Services. IETF working group, Applications area.
 Chair, POP, Post Office Protocol. IETF working group, Applications area. Concluded April 1993.
 Chair, SNMP, Simple Network Management Protocol. IETF working group, Network Management area. Concluded November 1991.

Books
Rose has written the following published books:

References 

1961 births
Living people
University of California, Irvine alumni
People in information technology
American software engineers
21st-century American writers
Engineers from California